Miroslav Metzner-Fritz (5 January 1904 – 27 February 1992) was a Yugoslav wrestler. He competed in the men's Greco-Roman lightweight at the 1928 Summer Olympics.

References

External links
 

1904 births
1992 deaths
Yugoslav male sport wrestlers
Olympic wrestlers of Yugoslavia
Wrestlers at the 1928 Summer Olympics
Sportspeople from Vienna